Kul or KUL may refer to:

Airports
 KUL, current IATA code for Kuala Lumpur International Airport, Malaysia
 KUL, former IATA code for Sultan Abdul Aziz Shah Airport (Subang Airport), Malaysia

Populated places
 Kul, Iran, a village in Kurdistan Province
 Kül or Külköy, Karahalli, a town in Turkey

Universities
 John Paul II Catholic University of Lublin (Katolicki Uniwersytet Lubelski),  Poland
 Kingston University London,  England
 Katholieke Universiteit Leuven, (Katholieke Universiteit Leuven),  Belgium